Microcrambus is a genus of moths of the family Crambidae. The genus was described by Stanisław Błeszyński in 1963.

Species
Microcrambus agnesiella (Dyar, 1914)
Microcrambus arcas Błeszyński, 1967
Microcrambus asymmetricus Błeszyński, 1967
Microcrambus atristrigellus (Hampson, 1919)
Microcrambus bellargus Błeszyński, 1967
Microcrambus bifurcatus Błeszyński, 1967
Microcrambus biguttellus (Forbes, 1920)
Microcrambus caracasellus Błeszyński, 1967
Microcrambus castrella (Schaus, 1922)
Microcrambus chrysoporellus (Hampson, 1895)
Microcrambus copelandi Klots, 1968
Microcrambus croesus Błeszyński, 1967
Microcrambus cyllarus Błeszyński, 1963
Microcrambus discludellus (Möschler, 1890)
Microcrambus elegans (Clemens, 1860)
Microcrambus elpenor Błeszyński, 1967
Microcrambus expansellus (Zeller, 1877)
Microcrambus flemingi Błeszyński, 1967
Microcrambus francescella (Schaus, 1922)
Microcrambus grisetinctellus (Hampson, 1896)
Microcrambus hector Błeszyński, 1963
Microcrambus hippuris Błeszyński, 1967
Microcrambus holothurion Błeszyński, 1967
Microcrambus immunellus (Zeller, 1872)
Microcrambus intangens (Dyar, 1914)
Microcrambus jolas Błeszyński, 1967
Microcrambus kimballi Klots, 1968
Microcrambus laurellus Błeszyński, 1967
Microcrambus matheri Klots, 1968
Microcrambus mercury Błeszyński, 1963
Microcrambus minor (Forbes, 1920)
Microcrambus niphosella (Hampson, 1908)
Microcrambus paucipunctellus (Schaus, 1922)
Microcrambus podalirius Błeszyński, 1967
Microcrambus polingi (Kearfott, 1908)
Microcrambus priamus Błeszyński, 1967
Microcrambus prolixus Błeszyński, 1967
Microcrambus psythiella (Schaus, 1913)
Microcrambus pusionellus (Zeller, 1863)
Microcrambus retuselloides Błeszyński, 1967
Microcrambus retusellus (Schaus, 1913)
Microcrambus rotarellus (Dyar, 1927)
Microcrambus strabelos Błeszyński, 1967
Microcrambus subretusellus Błeszyński, 1967
Microcrambus tactellus (Dyar, 1914)

References

Crambini
Crambidae genera
Taxa named by Stanisław Błeszyński